St. Ives: Being The Adventures of a French Prisoner in England (1897) is an unfinished novel by Robert Louis Stevenson. It was completed in 1898 by Arthur Quiller-Couch.

Unable to write, Stevenson dictated thirty chapters of the novel to his stepdaughter as a diversion from his debilitating illness. He alternated dictating St. Ives and The Weir of Hermiston but gradually lost interest in the former.

The book plot concerns the adventures of the dashing Viscomte Anne de Keroual de St. Ives, a Napoleonic soldier enlisted as a private under the name Champdivers, after his capture by the British.

The book is available on Project Gutenberg in both its incomplete and complete form (for the story as completed by Arthur Quiller-Couch look for "The Works of Robert Louis Stevenson volume twenty.").

Film adaptations
The 1949 film The Secret of St. Ives and the 1998 film St. Ives, also known as All For Love, were based on the novel. A television mini-series based on the novel was broadcast on the BBC in 1955.

For the movie the character may have been changed to a Captain, and his first name changed to Jacque, as there seems to be confusion on these points.

References

External links
 
St. Ives, available at Internet Archive (scanned books original editions illustrated)

1897 British novels
Novels by Robert Louis Stevenson
Unfinished novels
Unfinished literature completed by others
Scottish novels
Novels published posthumously
British novels adapted into films
British novels adapted into television shows